Aneogmena is a genus of flies in the family Tachinidae.

Species
 A. compressa (Baranov, 1936)
 A. fischeri Brauer & von Bergenstamm
 A. lucifera Walker, 1852
 A. secunda (Villeneuve, 1929)

References

Diptera of Asia
Exoristinae
Tachinidae genera
Taxa named by Friedrich Moritz Brauer
Taxa named by Julius von Bergenstamm